Esra Tromp (born 15 October 1990) is a Dutch former racing cyclist, who now works as the team manager for UCI Women's Continental Team . She competed in the 2013 UCI women's team time trial in Florence.

See also
2011 Skil Koga season
2012 Team Skil-Argos season
2013 Team Argos-Shimano season
2014 Parkhotel Valkenburg Continental Team season

References

External links

1990 births
Living people
Dutch female cyclists
People from Coevorden
Cyclists from Drenthe
21st-century Dutch women